Alberto Valdés Lacarra Jr. (30 November 1950 – 19 December 2020) was a Mexican equestrian and Olympic medalist.

References

1950 births
2020 deaths
Mexican male equestrians
Olympic equestrians of Mexico
Equestrians at the 1980 Summer Olympics
Equestrians at the 1992 Summer Olympics
Equestrians at the 1987 Pan American Games
Medalists at the 1980 Summer Olympics
Pan American Games bronze medalists for Mexico
Olympic bronze medalists for Mexico
Pan American Games medalists in equestrian
Medalists at the 1987 Pan American Games